Haarig Commercial Historic District is a national historic district located at Cape Girardeau, Missouri. It developed between about 1875 and 1950, and includes representative examples of Italianate and Tudor Revival architecture. They are predominantly two- and three-story brick commercial buildings.

It was listed on the National Register of Historic Places in 2000.

References

Historic districts on the National Register of Historic Places in Missouri
Italianate architecture in Missouri
Tudor Revival architecture in Missouri
Historic districts in Cape Girardeau County, Missouri
National Register of Historic Places in Cape Girardeau County, Missouri